Philo Remington (October 31, 1816 – April 4, 1889) was an American businessman. He was the eldest son of Eliphalet Remington, the founder of Remington Arms.

Early life
Philo Remington was born on October 31, 1816  in Litchfield, New York, U.S. He was the eldest of five children, born to Abigail (née Paddock) and Eliphalet Remington.

Career
In 1839 he joined his father's business, the name of which was already "E. Remington & Son". In 1845, when his brother Samuel also joined the firm, its name was changed to "E. Remington & Sons".

Phil was the manager of the mechanical department in his father's small-arms factory for over 25 years. He improved arms manufacture with the reflection method of straightening gun barrels and manufactured the first successful cast-steel, drilled rifle barrel made in the United States.

After his father's death, Philo headed the company and supplied small arms to the Union during the American Civil War.

He was active when the firm won the contract to manufacture what was then known as the Sholes and Glidden typewriter on March 1, 1873. Philo Remington retired in 1886.

He was the president of the village of Ilion, New York, for 20 years.

Personal life
Remington was married and had two daughters.

Death
Remington died of bilious fever on April 4, 1889 while in Silver Springs, Florida.

See also
 E. Remington and Sons
 Remington Arms

References

External links

 Watson C. Squires Papers, University of Washington (source for death date)

1816 births
1889 deaths
People from Herkimer County, New York
People from Ilion, New York
American manufacturing businesspeople
19th-century American businesspeople